Holy Ghost! is the first studio album by the electronic band Holy Ghost!. It was released in 2011 through DFA Records.

Track listing

Charts

Release history

References

2011 debut albums
DFA Records albums
Holy Ghost! albums